The SPAD S.XXIV was a prototype fighter plane built by SPAD at the end of World War I.

Design and development
The S.XXIV was a single-seat biplane fighter of all-wood construction with a canvas coating and a monocoque fuselage.

Specifications (variant specified)

References

Fighter aircraft
Biplanes
1910s French fighter aircraft
S.XXIV
Single-engined tractor aircraft
Aircraft first flown in 1918